The relict ground squirrel (Spermophilus relictus) is a species of rodent in the family Sciuridae. It is found in Kazakhstan, Kyrgyzstan and Uzbekistan. It is thought to be synonymous with Spermophilus ralli, whose name was formerly used for the Tian Shan ground squirrel (S. nilkaensis).

References

Spermophilus
Mammals described in 1923
Taxonomy articles created by Polbot